The Gas and Water Works Facilities Act 1870 Amendment Act 1873 (36 & 37 Vict. c LXXXIX) extended and amended the provisions of the Gas and Water Works Facilities Act 1870.

Background 
Having operated under the 1870 Act, the Board of Trade thought it was expedient to have powers to make provisional orders, to hold Inquiries and to make or amend rules for enforcing the Act.

Gas and Water Works Facilities Act 1870 Amendment Act 1873 
The Gas and Water Works Facilities Act 1870 Amendment Act 1873 received royal assent on 5 August 1873. Its long title is ‘An Act to extend and amend the provisions of the Gas and Water Works Facilities Act, 1870.’

Provisions 
The Act comprises 15 sections and a schedule:

 Section 1: Short Title. This Act may be cited for all purposes as "The Gas and Water Works Facilities Act 1870, Amendment Act, 1873."
 Sections 2 to 11: repealed by the Statute Law Revision Act 1883 (46 & 47 Vict. c 39).
 Section 12: Provisional Orders. Power of Board of Trade to revoke, amend, extend, or vary Provisional Order.
 Section 13: Inquiries. Where, in relation to any application for a Provisional Order under the Gas and Water Works Facilities Act 1870, or under this Act, it is in the opinion of the Board of Trade expedient that an inquiry should be held, they may order and direct such inquiry to be held at such time and place as they may think proper.
 Section 14: Rules for carrying Acts into effect. The Board of Trade may from time to time make, and, when made, may rescind, annul, or add to, the rules for carrying the Acts into effect.
 Section 15: This Act shall not apply to any place within the Metropolis as the same is defined in the Metropolis Management Act, 1855.
 Schedule: repealed by the Statute Law Revision Act 1883 (46 & 47 Vict. c 39).

Amendments and Repeal 
The Act was repealed by the Gas Act 1948.

See also 
 Oil and gas industry in the United Kingdom

References 

United Kingdom Acts of Parliament 1873